Vaceuchelus foveolatus is a species of sea snail, a marine gastropod mollusk in the family Chilodontidae.

Description
The height of the shell reaches 8 mm. The small, solid, white, very minutely perforated shell has a globose-conic shape. The spire is short. The four whorls are convex and encircled by strong spiral ribs. The interstices between them are deeply, coarsely pitted by the prominence of strong, regular, longitudinal lamellae, continuous over the spirals. The penultimate and next earlier whorls have 3 spirals (the subsutural one sometimes subobsolete). The outer lip is inserted upon the fourth. On the body whorl near the aperture there are 7, but sometimes more, by reason of the interpolation of one or two interstitial riblets on the upper surface. Two or three submedian ribs are generally more prominent. The sutures are canaliculate. The aperture is rounded. The columella is slightly concave, rather wide and flat, but not toothed at base. The umbilical perforation is minute.

This is a very distinct little shell, with coarsely latticed sculpture.

Distribution
This marine species occurs off Northern Queensland, Australia,  in the Tuamotu Archipelago, Polynesia and the Philippines.

References

 Marshall B. A. (1979). The Trochidae and Turbinidae of the Kermadec Ridge (Mollusca: Gastropoda). New Zealand Journal of Zoology 6: 521-552 page(s): 524
 Bosch D.T., Dance S.P., Moolenbeek R.G. & Oliver P.G. (1995) Seashells of eastern Arabia. Dubai: Motivate Publishing. 296 pp.
 Vilvens, C. (2017). New species and new records of Chilodontidae (Gastropoda: Vetigastropoda: Seguenzioidea) from the Pacific Ocean. Novapex, Hors Série. 11: 1-67

External links
 Adams, A. (1853). Contributions towards a monograph of the Trochidae, a family of gasteropodous Mollusca. Proceedings of the Zoological Society of London. (1851) 19: 150-192
 Pease, W. H. (1868). Description of sixty-five new species of marine Gastropodae, inhabiting Polynesia. American Journal of Conchology. 3(4): 271-297, pls 23-24
  Herbert D.G. (2012) A revision of the Chilodontidae (Gastropoda: Vetigastropoda: Seguenzioidea) of southern Africa and the south-western Indian Ocean. African Invertebrates, 53(2): 381–502
 
 To Encyclopedia of Life
 To World Register of Marine Species
 To Encyclopedia of Life
 To World Register of Marine Species

foveolatus
Gastropods described in 1853